Major-General Sir Nigel (Prior Hanson) Tapp KBE CB DSO (1904–1991) was General Officer Commanding East Africa Command.

Military career
Educated at Bedford School, Nigel Tapp was commissioned into the Royal Artillery in 1924. He served in the Sudan Defence Force from 1932 to 1938.

He also served in World War II initially as a General Staff Officer with the British Expeditionary Force and then as a General Staff Officer at the War Office. He was appointed Commanding Officer of 7th Field Regiment Royal Artillery in 1942 and was still commanding it during Operation Overlord in June 1944. He then became Commander Royal Artillery for 25th Division in 1945.

After the War he became District Commander for Eritrea in 1946 and then deputy director of Land/Air Warfare at the War Office in 1948. He was made deputy director, Royal Artillery in 1949. He became Commander, Royal Artillery, for 1st (British) Corps in 1951 and General Officer Commanding 2nd Anti Aircraft Group in 1954. He was Director of Military Training at the War Office from 1955 to 1957 when he became General Officer Commanding East Africa Command; he retired in 1961.

References

External links
Generals of World War II

 

1904 births
1991 deaths
People educated at Bedford School
Knights Commander of the Order of the British Empire
Companions of the Order of the Bath
Companions of the Distinguished Service Order
British Army major generals
Royal Artillery officers
Sudan Defence Force officers
British Army brigadiers of World War II
Deputy Lieutenants of Greater London